William Pairman Brown was a Scottish amateur footballer who played in the Scottish League for Queen's Park as an inside forward.

Personal life 
Brown served as a sergeant in the Highland Light Infantry during the First World War and was later commissioned into the Argyll and Sutherland Highlanders as a lieutenant. He was wounded during the course of his service.

Career statistics

References

1889 births
Military personnel from Lanarkshire
Scottish footballers
Scottish Football League players
British Army personnel of World War I
Highland Light Infantry soldiers
People from Blantyre, South Lanarkshire
Association football inside forwards
Queen's Park F.C. players
Date of death missing
Motherwell F.C. players
Dunfermline Athletic F.C. players
Heart of Midlothian F.C. players
St Bernard's F.C. players
Raith Rovers F.C. players
Argyll and Sutherland Highlanders officers
Footballers from South Lanarkshire